The push-up (sometimes called a press-up in British English) is a common calisthenics exercise beginning from the prone position. By raising and lowering the body using the arms, push-ups exercise the pectoral muscles, triceps, and anterior deltoids, with ancillary benefits to the rest of the deltoids, serratus anterior, coracobrachialis and the midsection as a whole. Push-ups are a basic exercise used in civilian athletic training or physical education and commonly in military physical training. They are also a common form of punishment used in the military, school sport, and some martial arts disciplines.

Etymology
The American English term push-up was first used between 1905 and 1910, while the British press-up was first recorded between 1945 and 1950.

Body mass supported during push-ups
According to the study published in Journal of Strength and Conditioning Research, the test subjects supported with their hands, on average, 69.16% of their body mass in the up position, and 75.04% in the down position during the traditional push-ups. In modified push-ups, where knees are used as the pivot point, subjects supported 53.56% and 61.80% of their body mass in up and down positions, respectively.

Muscles worked
While the push-up primarily targets the muscles of the chest, arms, and shoulders, support required from other muscles results in a wider range of muscles integrated into the exercise.

Abdominals 
The rectus abdominis and transversus abdominis contract continually while performing push-ups to hold the body off the floor and keep the legs and torso aligned. The rectus abdominis spans the front of the abdomen and is the most prominent of the abdominal muscles. The transversus abdominis lies deep within the abdomen, wrapping around the entire abdominal area. Both muscles compress the abdomen, and the rectus abdominis also flexes the spine forward, although it does not execute this function when performing push-ups.

Deltoid 
The anterior portion of the deltoid muscle is one of the major shoulder-joint horizontal adductors, moving the upper arms toward the chest during the upward phase of a push-up. It also helps control the speed of movement during the downward phase. The deltoid attaches to parts of the clavicle and scapula, just above the shoulder joint on one end, and to the outside of the humerus bone on the other. Along with horizontal adduction, the anterior deltoid assists with flexion and internal rotation of the humerus within the shoulder socket.

Chest muscles 
The push up requires the work of many muscle groups, with one of the primary muscle groups being the chest muscles, the pectoralis major and the minor. These are the two large chest muscles and the main pushing muscle group of the upper body. When pushing and lowering the body during a push-up, the pectoralis major is doing most of the work. As a result, these muscles become very strong and can become defined as lean muscle after doing push-ups regularly.

Stabilisers: back body 
The push-up depends on stabiliser muscles as the body is pushed and lowered. The erector spinae is the main stabiliser muscle in the back. Made up of three muscles including the spinal, longissimus, and iliocostalis. The spinal runs adjacent to the spine, the longissimus runs adjacent to the spinal and the iliocostalis runs adjacent to the longissimus and over the ribs. Two muscles called the gluteus medius and gluteus minimus stabilise the upper leg. The medius and minimus sit under the largest butt muscle, the gluteus maximus.

Triceps brachii 
While the anterior deltoids and pectoralis major muscles work to horizontally adduct the upper arms during the upward phase of a push-up, the triceps brachii muscles, or triceps for short, are also hard at work extending the elbow joints so the arms can be fully extended. The triceps also control the speed of elbow-joint flexion during the downward phase of the exercise. The closer together the hands are placed during a push-up, the harder the triceps work. The muscle is divided into three heads — the lateral head, long head, and medial head. The lateral and medial heads attach to the back of the humerus bone, and the long head attaches just behind the shoulder socket on one end; all three heads combine and attach to the back of the elbow on the other.

Forearms 
Stabilizers include wrist and forearm muscles, the knee extensors, and the hip/spine flexors, which all work isometrically to maintain a proper plank position in the standard prone push-up.

Biceps 
During the push-up exercise, the short head of the biceps brachii muscle acts as a dynamic stabilizer. This means the muscle activates at both ends—the elbow and the shoulder—to help stabilize the joints.

Joints and tendons 
Inner muscles that support the operation of the fingers, wrists, forearms, and elbows are also worked isometrically. Some push-up modifications that require to have the arms at different heights effectively engage the rotator cuff.

Variations
In the "full push-up", the back and legs are straight and off the floor. There are several variations besides the common push-up. These include bringing the thumbs and index fingers of both hands together (a "diamond push-up") as well as having the elbows pointed towards the knees. These variations are intended to put greater emphasis on the triceps or shoulders, rather than the chest muscles. When both hands are unbalanced or on uneven surfaces, this exercise works the body core. Raising the feet or hands onto elevated surfaces during the exercise emphasizes the upper (minor) or lower (major) pectorals, respectively. Raising the hands with the aid of push-up bars or a dumbbell allows for a greater range of motion, providing further stress for the muscles.

Weighted push-ups
Progressively overloading classic push-ups using barbell plates, resistance bands or any form of weight. The load is usually positioned on the upper back. This very effective exercise is not commonly performed because of the difficulty of loading the human body in that position. An alternate way to add weight to the push-up is by placing your hands on high handles bars and then elevating your feet on a high surface to get into a suspended push-up position. Now due to the distance between the pelvis and the floor a dipping belt can be used to add weights from the pelvis. This method of adding extra weight to the push-up becomes more efficient.

Knee push-ups
"Modified" or "knee" push-ups are performed by supporting the lower body on the knees instead of the toes, which reduces the difficulty. These are sometimes used in fitness tests for women, corresponding to regular push-ups for men. This is useful for warm-ups/downs, pyramids/drop sets, endurance training, and rehab. It can also be used to train in a more explosive plyometric manner (like clapping push-ups) when one can't perform them with the feet. It can also be used with the 1-arm variations as a transition. However, the intense pressure on the knees can be harmful.

Planche push-ups

An extremely difficult variation is to perform a push-up using only hands, without resting the feet on the floor, i.e., starting from and returning to the planche position. These are known as "planche push-ups". To do this variation, the body's center of gravity must be kept over the hands while performing the push-up by leaning forward while the legs are elevated in the air, which requires great strength and a high level of balance. The entire body weight is lifted in this variation.

Knuckle push-ups
Another variation is to perform push-ups on the knuckles of the fist, rather than with palms of the hands on the floor. This method is also commonly used in martial arts, such as Karate and Tae Kwon Do, and may be used in boxing training while wearing boxing gloves.

The intent, in addition to building strength and conditioning, is to toughen the knuckles, wrist, and forearm in the punching position. This variation also reduces the amount of strain in the wrist, compared to the typical "palms on floor" approach, and so it is sometimes used by those with wrist injuries. Such practitioners will usually perform their knuckle push-ups on a padded floor or a rolled-up towel, unlike martial artists, who may do bare-knuckle push-ups on hard floors.

Maltese push-up
The Maltese push-up is a gymnastic variation of the push-up, in which the hands are positioned further down towards the hips (as opposed to roughly alongside the pectorals), but with a wide distance between them.

Hindu push-up

The most basic form of Hindu push-up starts from the downward dog yoga position (hands and feet on the floor with the posterior raised) and transitions to a cobra pose position (hands and feet on the floor with the torso arched forwards and the legs close to the floor). It is also known as a dand, and is still widely known by this title especially in India where it originated from. It is a common exercise in Indian physical culture and martial arts, particularly Pehlwani. The famous martial artist Bruce Lee also used it in his training regime and referred to it as a cat stretch. It is an effective core strength exercise because it dynamically involves both the anterior and posterior chains in a harmonious fashion. There are numerous variations of the Hindu push-up although most incorporate the two postures used in the most basic version. It may also be known as a Hanuman, judo, or dive-bomber push-up.

Guillotine push-up
The guillotine push-up is a form of push-up done from an elevated position (either hands-on elevated platforms or traditionally medicine balls) wherein the practitioner lowers the chest, head, and neck (thus the name) past the plane of the hands. The goal is to stretch the shoulders and put extra emphasis on the muscles there.

Backhanded push-up
The backhanded push-up is a form of push-ups performed using the back of the hands, rather than the palms. Currently, the record holder of the backhanded push-ups is Bill Kathan who broke the world record in 2010, by performing 2,396 on Valentine's Day.

One arm versions

Many of the push-up variations can be done using one arm instead of two. This will further increase the resistance put upon the trainee.

Single-leg push-up
To do single leg push-up lift one of your leg off the ground and do a set. Repeat the same with another leg.

Narrow-grip push-up
Do a normal push-up with your hands just a few inches apart from each other underneath the chest.

Wide-grip push-up
Similar to a normal push-up but with hands wider than shoulder width. This works the chest and shoulders more.

Clap push-up
At the peak of the push-up, push yourself up off the ground and quickly clap in midair. The fast jolting force of clap push-ups will help develop explosive power while also bulking up the pectoral muscles for a more defined chest.

Spider-Man push-up
Do a normal push-up but raise one knee toward the elbow of the same side as you rise. Switch knees with each rep.
Also, add more stress to your abs with a 2-second hold.

Other versions
There are some less difficult versions, which reduce the effort by supporting some of the bodyweights in some way. One can move on to the standard push-up after progress is made.

"Wall" push-ups are performed by standing close to a wall and pushing away from the wall with the arms; one can increase the difficulty by moving one's feet farther from the wall.

"Table" or "chair" push-ups are performed by pushing away from a table, chair, or other object. The lower the object, the more difficult the push-up. One should be sure that the object is securely stationary before attempting to push up from it.

"Three-phase" push-ups involve simply breaking a standard push up into three components and doing each one slowly and deliberately. Participants usually start face down on the floor with hands outstretched either perpendicular or parallel to the body. The first phase involves the arms being brought palms down on a 90-degree angle at the elbows. The second phase involves the body being pushed into the up position. The third phase is returning to the starting position. This technique is commonly used after a large block of regular push-ups, as it poses less stress and requires less effort.

"Diamond" or "Triceps" push-ups are done by placing both palms on the ground and touching together both thumbs and pointer fingers. This technique requires stronger triceps muscles than regular push-ups because, at the bottom of the stroke, the forearm is nearly parallel to the ground and the elbow is almost completely flexed, resulting in a much higher mechanical load on the triceps. There is a special sub-set of the diamond push-up (so named for the diamond-shaped space between the hands when the thumb and forefinger of the left hand are placed on the floor up against the thumb and forefinger of the right hand.) The special version of this push-up is when the diamond is placed directly below the nose instead of the solar plexus. The nose must almost touch the floor in the center of the diamond. This special diamond push-up is done by the United States Marine Corps. The lips must come within 1 inch of the floor while keeping the neck in line with the straight spine to qualify as a valid push-up. This can be verified by placing a 1-inch foam disposable earplug on the floor in the center of the diamond and picking it up with the lips.

"Hollow-Body" push-ups are performed in the position gymnasts call the "hollow body". In the plank version of the hollow body, the shoulders are protracted into a pronounced curve in the upper back while the abdominal muscles are tightened and the legs are locked and squeezed together. This variation requires full-body tension to execute and results in greater integration of the hips, shoulders, and core.

Plyometrics
Two platforms are placed beside the trainee, one on either side. The exercise begins with the hands-on either platform supporting the body, then the subject drops to the ground and explosively rebounds with a push-up, extending the torso and arms completely off the ground and returning the hands to the platforms.

Another is simply an explosive push-up where a person attempts to push quickly and with enough force to raise his or her hands several centimeters off the ground, with the body completely suspended on the feet for a moment, a variation of the drop push. This is necessary for performing 'clap push-ups' - i.e. clapping the hands while in the air.

Aztec push-ups

The Aztec push-up is one of the most difficult plyometric push-ups.  A person performs an Aztec push-up by beginning in the normal push-up starting position and exploding upward with both the hands and feet, driving the entire body into the air.  While in the air, the body is bent at the waist and the hands quickly touch the toes.  The body is then quickly straightened and the hands and feet break the fall, returning the body to the normal push-up position for another repetition.

360 push ups

The 360 push-up is a variation of the superman push-up where one rotates 360 degrees while in the air.

 Falling and explosive rebound push ups
Here one falls to the ground from standing position and then using an explosive push-up gets back to standing position.

With push-ups, many possibilities for customization and increased intensity are possible. Some examples are: One hand can be set on a higher platform than the other or be farther away from the other to give more weight to the opposite arm/side of the body and also exercise many diverse muscles. One can perform push-ups by using only the tips of the fingers and thumb. For increased difficulty, push-ups can be performed on one arm or using weights.

Push-ups between chairs form an integral part of the "Dynamic Tension" Course devised by Charles Atlas, and similar systems.

Record breakers and attempts
 The first record for push-ups documented by Guinness World Records was 6,006 non-stop push-ups by Charles Linster.
 The most push ups in one hour is 3,877 and was achieved by Bijender Singh (India) on 20 September 1988. The Guinness world record for most push ups in one hour is 3,054 by Jarrad Young on 11 June 2021 in Queensland, Australia.
The most push ups in 24 hours is 46,001 and was achieved by Charles Servizio on 25 April 1993.
Doug Pruden (Canada) performed 1,025 one-arm push-ups on the back of the hand on 8 November 2008.
 Paul Henry Allen Lynch (UK) performed 124 consecutive one finger push-ups on 21 April 1992.
 The most knuckle push ups in one hour is 2,175, achieved by Syed Taj Muhammad (Pakistan) in March 2016.
 The most knuckle push ups in one hour by a woman is 1,206 by Eva Clarke (Australia) on 31 January 2014.
 The most consecutive headstand push ups on one arm is 7 by Yury Tikhonovich (Russia) on 1 April 2010. In recordholders the record is 12 by the same person.
 The most one finger push ups in 30 seconds was 41 and was achieved by Xie Guizhong (China) on the set of CCTV- Guinness World Records Special in Beijing, China.

Most push ups in one minute:
 hand release push ups: 64 by George Kotsimpos, (Greece) in December 2020,
 using back of hands: 132 by Abdul Latif Mahmoud Saadiq (Qatar) in November 2009.
 with the finger tips (10 fingers): 105 by Graham Maly (UK) in May 2009.
 with claps: 90 by Stephen Buttler (UK) in November 2011.
 knuckle: 84 by Roy Berger (Canada) in June 2016.
 one arm using the back of the hand: 59 by Doug Pruden (Canada) in March 2007.
 two finger push ups (two arms): 52 by Aryan Grover (India) in August 2015.
 Aztec push ups: 50 by Jason Shen (US) in January 2014.
 two finger push ups (one arm): 46 by Mohammed Mohammed Ali Zeinhom (Egypt) in March 2010.
 with a 100 lb pack: 49 by Alejandro Soler Tarí (Spain) in September 2020.
 one arm carrying a 40 lb pack: 33 by Hiroyuki Gondou (Japan) in May 2014.
 Most knuckle pushups carrying 40 lb pack: 52 by Desh Deepak in Jan 2018.

In the animal kingdom
There are zoology observations that certain animals emulate a push up action. Most notably various taxa of the fence lizard exhibit this display, primarily involving the male engaging in postures to attract females. The western fence lizard is a particular species that also engage in this behavior. (It may be noted that in Mexican Spanish, push-ups are called "Lagartijas", which means "lizards".)

See also
 Pull-up (exercise)
 Dip (exercise)
 Bench press
 Calisthenics
 Handstand pushup
 Jumping jack
 Plank (exercise)
 Sit-up (exercise)
 World Push Up Championships

References

External links

Bodyweight exercises
Articles containing video clips
Physical exercise
Strength training